A Gang Story is a 2011 French drama film directed by Olivier Marchal.

Cast 
 Gérard Lanvin - Edmond "Momon" Vidal
 Tchéky Karyo - Serge Suttel
 Daniel Duval - Christo
 Lionnel Astier - Dany
 Dimitri Storoge - young "Momon" Vidal
 Patrick Catalifo - Kommissar Max Brauner
 François Levantal - Joan Chavez
 Francis Renaud - Brandon
 Valeria Cavalli - Janou Vidal
 Estelle Skornik - Lilou Suttel
 Étienne Chicot - The Greek
 Palwinder Singh - PS

Remake 
In 2020, a Hindi-language Indian remake titled Yaara was released.

References

External links 

2011 drama films
2011 films
Films about bank robbery
Films directed by Olivier Marchal
Films set in Lyon
Films set in the 1970s
French neo-noir films
French gangster films
Films shot in Lyon
2010s French films